The Canon de 105 court modèle 1934 Schneider was a French howitzer used in World War II. Captured weapons were used by the German Heer as the 10.5 cm leFH 324(f). It was a conservative design by Schneider et Cie. Production was slow with only 144 built by the beginning of the Battle of France. A more advanced 105 mm howitzer design, the Canon de 105 court modèle 1935 B, was produced by the State Arsenal at Bourges, and was ordered in larger numbers.  70 105 mm howitzers mod. 1934 Schneider bought by Lithuania (105 mm 1934 m. haubica) in 1937.

References 

 Engelmann, Joachim and Scheibert, Horst. Deutsche Artillerie 1934-1945: Eine Dokumentation in Text, Skizzen und Bildern: Ausrüstung, Gliederung, Ausbildung, Führung, Einsatz. Limburg/Lahn, Germany: C. A. Starke, 1974
 Gander, Terry and Chamberlain, Peter. Weapons of the Third Reich: An Encyclopedic Survey of All Small Arms, Artillery and Special Weapons of the German Land Forces 1939-1945. New York: Doubleday, 1979 

World War II weapons of France
105 mm artillery
Schneider Electric
Military equipment introduced in the 1930s